Mu Ying (1345–1392) was a Chinese military general and politician during the Ming dynasty, and an adopted son of its founder, the Hongwu Emperor.

When the Ming dynasty emerged, the Hongwu Emperor's military officers who served under him were given noble titles which privileged the holder with a stipend but in all other aspects was merely symbolic. Mu Ying's family was among them. Special rules guarding against potential abuse of power were implemented on the nobles. His family remained in Yunnan where Mu and his descendants guarded until the end of the Ming dynasty.
As late as the 1650s, his descendant Mu Tianbao was one of the main supporters of the Yongli Emperor, the last emperor of the Southern Ming, and accompanied the fugitive emperor all the way into Toungoo Burma.

Family 
Consort and issue(s): 
Lady Zhaojing of Qianning, of the Feng clan (黔宁昭靖王夫人冯氏)
Lady Zhaojing of Qianning, of the Geng clan (黔宁昭靖王继夫人耿氏, 1344-1431)
Lady Baosheng, of the Fang clan (鲍生夫人方氏, 1357 – 1439)
Mu Ang, Count of Dingbian (定边伯 沐昂, d. 1445), fifth son
Lady Gaoming, of the Yan clan  (诰命夫人颜氏, d.1448)
Mu Xin, Marquis of Xiping (西平侯 沐昕), fourth son
Unknown:
Mu Chun, Marquis of Xiping (西平侯沐春, d. 1399), first son
Mu Sheng, Duke of Qian (黔國公 沐晟, 1368 – 1449), second son
Mu Chang (沐昶), third son

Ethnicity

In his The References of History of Islam in China, Bai Shouyi wrote明代開國的勳臣，如常遇春，胡大海，沐英，藍玉，據說都是回回。我在雲南多年，會留心打聽沐英和回教的關係，沒有得到甚麼可靠的證據，並且雲南底（的）回教父老似乎也對沐英沒有甚麼興趣，我曾在昆明發現姓沐的回回，但他們說不出自己的世系來，他們不一定就是沐英底（的）後人。後來我又在蒙自鳳尾村聽到一位沐阿衡（阿訇）說自己就是沐英之後，但他拿不出他的宗譜來，而且他雖是一個阿衡（阿訇），他的祖宗不一定就是回回，所以沐英之為回回，是很難使人相信的……Bai explained that he failed to find any reliable proof of Mu Ying was a Hui Chinese. Thus, "it sounded unconvincing" to "identify him as one of Hui people". However, later, the biography of Mu was included in A History of the Chines Hui People, which was edited by Bai without further evidences.

Michael Dillon wrote "There is no suggestion in most western accounts of Mu Ying's career or the Chinese sources on which they draw that Mu Ying was anything other than a Han Chinese by origin, yet he has been included in the major series of studies of the lives of eminent Hui as a Muslim without any comment. The surname Mu is also common among Chinese Muslims and is probably derived from Muhammad, although it is normally written with a different Chinese character. The character used to write Mu Ying's surname is the one associated with washing the hair and which appears on signs in every mosque in China as the first character of muyu the ritual baths to be used before prayer." He concludes that "He was probably descended from an old Muslim family but there is no evidence that he was a practising Muslim."

Jonathan Neaman Lipman notes that Mu Ying is among a number of generals "unambiguously claimed as Muslim by Sino-Muslim scholars" mentioning specifically Bai Shouyi. He writes that "There is considerable doubt among non-Muslim scholars as to the “Muslim” identity of most of these generals, but Sino-Muslims assert their “Huiness” unequivocally. Tazaka, Chugoku ni okeru kaikyo, 861, for example, questions not only Chang Yuqun’s identification as a Huihui but that of many others as well. F. Mote, in Goodrich and Fang, Dictionary, 1079–83, indicates that we have no evidence that Mu Ying was born a Muslim, and the story of his adoption and upbringing in Zhu Yuanzhang’s intimate circle certainly indicates that he was not raised as one."

Popular culture
The descendants of Mu Ying are featured in Louis Cha's Wuxia novel The Deer and the Cauldron, set in the early Qing dynasty. The Mu Prince Residence based in Yunnan is a pro-Ming secret organisation that houses the descendants of Mu Ying and his followers. Mu Jianping of the seven wives of Wei Xiaobao (the protagonist), and her brother Mu Jiansheng, are direct descendants of Mu Ying.

References

External links
http://www.colorq.org/MeltingPot/Asia/ChineseWestAsians.htm

Ming dynasty generals
1345 births
1392 deaths
Generals from Anhui
Ming dynasty politicians
Politicians from Chuzhou